Czarnowski (feminine: Czarnowska; plural: Czarnowscy) is a Polish surname. Notable people with the surname include:

 Hieronim Czarnowski (1834–1902), Polish chess player
 Jan Czarnowski (1883–1963), Polish nobleman
 Ortwin Czarnowski (born 1940), German cyclist
 Patryk Czarnowski (born 1985), Polish volleyball player
 Stefan Czarnowski (1879–1937), Polish sociologist

See also
 

Polish-language surnames